The Vandals were an East Germanic tribe.

Vandal may also refer to:

A person who commits vandalism

People
Albert Vandal (1853–1910), French count and historian
Dan Vandal (born 1960), Canadian politician
Liz Vandal (born 1965), Canadian fashion designer
Ecca Vandal, Australian rapper

Music
The Vandals, a 1980s American punk rock band
The Vandals (UK band), a 1970s British punk rock band
Ecca Vandal (album), a 2017 album by Ecca Vandal

Places

India 
 Wandal, Nidagundi, a village in Basavana Bagevadi Taluk, Bijapur district, Karnataka, India
 Wandal, Sindagi, a village in Sindgi Taluk, Bijapur district, Karnataka, India
 Wandal, Tamil Nadu, a village in Ilayangudi Taluk, Sivaganga district, Tamil Nadu, India

Other uses
Vandal (tanker), a 1903 Russian river tanker
Vandal (website), a Spanish video game blog
"Vandal", a poem by Patti Smith from her 1978 book Babel
The MQM-8G Vandal supersonic drone was made from converted RIM-8 Talos missiles
The Vandals, an evil alien species of anthropomorphic predators from the TV show Hot Wheels Battle Force 5
Idaho Vandals, the intercollegiate athletic teams of the University of Idaho

See also 
 
 Vandalism (band), Australian electro house group